

References

External links 
IMDB listing for German films made in 1945
filmportal.de listing for films made in 1945

German
Lists of German films

film